Jianguo is Chinese term meaning "nation-building". It may refer to:

People
 Chen Jianguo (born 1945), Chinese politician
 He Jianguo (born 1951), Chinese artist
 Jiang Jianguo (born 1956), Chinese politician
 Li Jianguo (born 1946), Chinese politician 
 Liu Chien-kuo (born 1969), Taiwanese politician
 Jianguo Liu (born 1963), Chinese ecologist
 Pang Chien-kuo (1953–2022), Taiwanese politician
 Qi Jianguo (born 1952), Chinese general
 Sui Jianguo, Chinese artist
 Sun Jianguo (born 1952), Chinese admiral 
 Jianguo Wu, Chinese ecologist
 Xu Jianguo (1903–1977), Chinese politician

Other
Jianguo Road (disambiguation)
Jianguo, Gucheng County, Hebei, a town in Gucheng County, Hebei

See also
Chienkuo Technology University, in Changhua, Taiwan
Kenkoku University, defunct university in modern-day Changchun, China
Baekdu Hagwon, South Korean international school in Osaka, Japan 
Konkuk University, South Korean university with campuses in Seoul and Changju
Taipei Municipal Jianguo High School, in Taipei, Taiwan